Pericycos sulawensis is a species of beetle in the family Cerambycidae. It was described by Karl-Ernst Hüdepohl in 1990. It is known from Sulawesi.

References

Lamiini
Beetles described in 1990